Dyscherus is a genus of beetles in the family Carabidae, containing the following species:

 Dyscherus ambondrombe Bulirsch, Janák & Moravec, 2005
 Dyscherus bongolavae Basilewsky, 1979
 Dyscherus costatus (Klug, 1833)
 Dyscherus descarpentriesi Basilewsky, 1976
 Dyscherus gigas Basilewsky, 1979
 Dyscherus janaki Bulirsch & Moravec, 2009
 Dyscherus mocquerysi Bänninger, 1934
 Dyscherus occidentalis Basilewsky, 1976
 Dyscherus pauliani Basilewsky, 1976
 Dyscherus peyrierasi Basilewsky, 1976
 Dyscherus punctatostriatus Basilewsky, 1976
 Dyscherus sicardi Jeannel, 1946
 Dyscherus storthodontoides Bänninger, 1935
 Dyscherus subgranulatus Basilewsky, 1954
 Dyscherus viettei Basilewsky, 1973

References

Scaritinae